SITE railway station (Sindhi: سائيٽ ريلوي اسٽيشن) is  located in Karachi, Pakistan, and serves the Sindh Industrial Trading Estate (SITE), one of Asia's largest industrial estates.

See also
 List of railway stations in Pakistan
 Pakistan Railways

References

External links

Railway stations in Karachi
Railway stations on Karachi Circular Railway
SITE Town